Timothy Campbell  (born c. 1978) is an English businessman best known as the winner of the first series of the British version of The Apprentice, a BBC TV reality show in which contestants competed to win a £100,000-a-year job working for businessman Alan Sugar.

The Apprentice
Campbell, a Middlesex University graduate in psychology, worked as a Senior Planner within the Strategy and Service Development (formally Marketing and Planning) directorate of London Underground before applying to appear on the show.

Campbell appeared as a contestant in series 1 of The Apprentice in February 2005 and was hired by Sir Alan Sugar in the final episode, screened in May 2005. Campbell was project manager for his team twice in the show in weeks 1 and 4. 
An hour-long documentary about Campbell's first year in his new job, entitled The Apprentice: Tim in the Firing Line, was aired on 19 February 2006, a few days before the launch of series 2.

Campbell replaced Claude Littner as Lord Sugar's aide for the show's 16th series due to injuries sustained by Littner as a result of a cycling accident. In 2023, after Littner suffered further medical issues, Campbell also replaced him in the 17th series from episode 2 through episode 10.

Post-Apprentice
After his victory, Campbell joined Sugar's company Amstrad on a £100,000 salary. He became Project Director of Amstrad's new Health & Beauty division. In autumn 2006, Campbell held a series of one-to-one advice sessions for budding entrepreneurs organised by the British Library's Business & Intellectual Property Centre.

In January 2007, he made a guest appearance in the special edition programme Comic Relief Does The Apprentice, in order to raise money for Comic Relief. He joined the contestants after actor Rupert Everett left the show early.

Campbell was kept on at Amstrad after the end of his original 12-month contract, but in March 2007, after two years at the company, he left to set up a perfume business but this was later abandoned. Lord Sugar said Campbell had been a "great asset". Campbell met public affairs consultant Richard Morris (who later founded the Heropreneurs charity) and together they co-founded Bright Ideas Trust. The pair were later joined by Paul Humphries.

In July 2007 Campbell became a Social Enterprise Ambassador as part of a British Government initiative that aims to apply modern business solutions to social and environmental problems. The programme is led by the Social Enterprise Coalition and supported by the Office of the Third Sector, a Government department responsible for charities, co-operatives, voluntary and community groups.

It was announced in the 2012 New Years Honours List that Campbell was to be made a Member of the Most Excellent Order of the British Empire (MBE) for Services to Enterprise Culture.

Since February 2012, Campbell has been a member of Estate Office Property Consultants, a boutique London property investment and development agency, where he focuses on investments and acquisitions for High Net Worth Individuals and organisations seeking prime property opportunities.

In 2016, Campbell co-founded Marketing Runners Ltd with Derin Cag, a bespoke digital marketing agency in London, where their clients to date include Wilfred Emmanuel-Jones.

Personal life
In 2013, Campbell became chair of the governing body of St Bonaventure's Catholic School, the school that he attended as a child.

See also
The Apprentice (British series 1)
Saira Khan

References

External links

Bright Ideas Trust
Tim Campbell - Inspiring Entrepreneur video

People educated at St Bonaventure's Catholic School
Alumni of Middlesex University
The Apprentice (British TV series) candidates
The Apprentice (franchise) winners
1979 births
English businesspeople
English people of Jamaican descent
Living people
People from Forest Gate
2005 in British television
Members of the Order of the British Empire